Sagola Township is a civil township of Dickinson County in the U.S. state of Michigan.  The population was 1,106 at the 2010 census, slightly down from 1,169 at the 2000 census.

Communities
There are no incorporated municipalities in the township. There are a few small unincorporated communities. 
 
It began as a railroad junction called "Ford Siding". In 1892, a post office was established named Channing, after John Parke Channing, a mining engineer who surveyed the area. The post office continues to serve ZIP code 49815.

Floodwood is on M-95 about five miles (8 km) north of Channing and two miles (3 km) south of the Marquette County boundary. It began as a lumber settlement on the Milwaukee and Northern Railroad. A post office was in operation there from 1887 until 1905.

The mining settlement formed because of the nearby Groveland Mine. It was a station on the Milwaukee and Northern Railroad in 1880 and a post office was in operation there from 1891 until 1932.

Sagola is on M-95 at the junction where M-69 branches off to the west. M-69 runs concurrently with M-95 south of town about six miles (10 km) to just north of Randville. It was formed, when in about 1885, five Chicago men formed the Sagola Lumber Company to harvest pine timber in the area. The name was derived from the local Indian word for "welcome". A post office was first established there in 1889, and continues today to serve ZIP code 49881.

Geography
Much of the township is the Copper Country State Forest. The northwest portion is drained by the Michigamme River. A small portion of the northeast is drained by tributaries of the Escanaba River. The central portion is drained by the Ford River, and the south by the Sturgeon River. 

Demographics
As of the census of 2000, there were 1,169 people, 475 households, and 323 families residing in the township.  The population density was 7.3 per square mile (2.8/km).  There were 930 housing units at an average density of 5.8 per square mile (2.2/km).  The racial makeup of the township was 98.20% White, 0.86% Native American, 0.09% Asian, 0.34% from other races, and 0.51% from two or more races. Hispanic or Latino of any race were 1.03% of the population. 11.7% were of Swedish, 7.6% Irish, 7.5% Italian, 6.7% English, 6.7% French, 5.8% Finnish and 5.1% American ancestry according to Census 2000.

There were 475 households, out of which 30.3% had children under the age of 18 living with them, 57.7% were married couples living together, 5.7% had a female householder with no husband present, and 32.0% were non-families. 28.2% of all households were made up of individuals, and 13.9% had someone living alone who was 65 years of age or older.  The average household size was 2.46 and the average family size was 3.04.

In the township the population was spread out, with 26.4% under the age of 18, 6.3% from 18 to 24, 25.6% from 25 to 44, 26.5% from 45 to 64, and 15.1% who were 65 years of age or older.  The median age was 40 years. For every 100 females, there were 100.2 males.  For every 100 females age 18 and over, there were 100.5 males.

The median income for a household in the township was $33,333, and the median income for a family was $42,250. Males had a median income of $31,900 versus $22,000 for females. The per capita income for the township was $15,531.  About 7.6% of families and 12.1% of the population were below the poverty line, including 13.9% of those under age 18 and 9.2% of those age 65 or over.

Bibliography

 Stevens, Viola (1977). A History of Channing, Michigan. [Green Bay, Wis.]: Stevens.

References

Townships in Dickinson County, Michigan
Iron Mountain micropolitan area
Townships in Michigan